The participation of Sri Lanka in the ABU TV Song Festival has occurred thrice since the inaugural ABU TV Song Festival began in 2012. Since their début in 2012, the Sri Lankan entry has been organised by the national broadcaster MTV Channel. In 2017, Sri Lanka withdrew from the festival.

History
MTV Channel is one of the founder members in the ABU TV Song Festivals, having participated in the very first ABU TV Song Festival 2012.

Withdrawal
Sri Lanka was not present on the final participation list that was published by the ABU.  The reasons for withdrawal from the ABU TV Song Festival 2014 are unknown.

Participation overview

References 

Countries at the ABU Song Festival